Actinoscyphia is a genus of sea anemones of the family Actinoscyphiidae.

Species 
The following species are recognized:

 Venus flytrap sea anemone (Actinoscyphia aurelia (Stephenson, 1918))
 Actinoscyphia groendyki Eash-Loucks & Fautin, 2012
 Actinoscyphia plebeia (McMurrich, 1893)
 Actinoscyphia saginata (Verrill, 1882)
 Actinoscyphia verrilli (Gravier, 1918)

References 

Actinoscyphiidae
Hexacorallia genera